Now, Now, formerly known as Now, Now Every Children, is an American indie rock duo formed in Blaine, Minnesota, United States, and based in Minneapolis. The band is composed of Cacie Dalager (vocals, guitar, keyboard) and Bradley Hale (drums, backing vocals).

History

Formation
The band was formed in roughly 2003. Classmates Cacie Dalager and Bradley Hale met in their high school marching band when they were both sixteen years old; they eventually started writing songs together, starting with an acoustic song dedicated to a college-bound friend. The band's name, according to Dalager, was an in-joke resulting from a typo in an online chat. The band considered using the name for an EP title, but it stuck as the band name when they officially started the project. Dalager and Hale were joined by Brad's sister Britty on keyboards, and school friend Justin Schweim on bass for the recording of their first EP and their first few shows in the Minneapolis area. Shortly before the band began recording their first album, Schweim left their live setup, and Christine Sako stepped in. Jess Abbott joined the band in Summer 2009 after moving from Maine to Minnesota, initially just for the summer until she left for college, however she became a permanent member shortly after. In 2017, after a new musical release, it was announced that Jess Abbott had left the band.

Cars (2007–2009)
In 2007, Now, Now signed to local Minneapolis-based indie record label Afternoon Records, founded by friend Ian Anderson. The band recorded and released two EPs on the label in early 2008, titled Not One, But Two and In The City. In September 2008, the band opened for Mates of State in Minneapolis, a performance that Dalager then regarded as "easily my favorite show we have ever played." Anderson produced their full-length debut album Cars, released digitally on February 27, 2009 and on CD on July 9, 2009. Its release was accompanied by an album release show on December 12 at Minneapolis venue 7th Street Entry. The band played The Bamboozle festival on May 3, 2009 and supported Paramore on tour across Europe in December 2009.

Label changes and Neighbors (2010–2011)
After about three years at Afternoon Records, Now, Now left the label, which they announced on their official blog on April 16, 2010. Since then, the band has shortened their name from "Now, Now Every Children" to simply "Now, Now". Of the name change, Dalager explained to SPIN: "We felt like we needed to disconnect ourselves from any childish image we had. It was a way of starting over and simplifying things for us."  Under their new name, they self-produced an EP titled Neighbors, which was digitally released on September 7, 2010 for 24 hours. There were also 140 physical copies of the EP made, which sold out within 8 minutes of going on sale. The album was re-released on December 7 via No Sleep Records. The band performed at the first Popsickle Festival, presented by Motion City Soundtrack, at First Avenue on December 18, 2010.

Now, Now began 2011 as a support act on all dates of Hellogoodbye's winter tour, along with Jukebox the Ghost, You, Me, and Everyone We Know and Gold Motel. The band was also scheduled to be one of the support acts for Fake Problems on their Spring 2011 tour, but pulled out to prepare new material for their next full-length record and to "clear [their] heads after so many straight months of touring"; they still performed on the Minnesota date. On May 3, 2011, Now, Now released a collection of remixes of the Neighbors tracks, called Neighbors: The Remixes. In the same announcement, it was confirmed that the band would be recording their second full-length album shortly thereafter, produced by Howard Redekopp.

The band gained some mainstream exposure when their song "Neighbors" appeared in an episode of Grey's Anatomy ("It's a Long Way Back"), which aired on April 28, 2011. In fall 2011, Now, Now performed a short tour supporting All Get Out, with an additional 2 dates supporting Mansions.

Threads (2012–2013)
On December 8, 2011, it was announced via their Facebook page that they had signed to Chris Walla's Trans Record Label - an imprint of Atlantic Records, and that their second album Threads would be released on March 6, 2012.

Since the release of Threads, Now, Now have been an opening act for The Naked And Famous' US Spring Tour, and joined fun. on their Summer US tour in May 2012. In September 2012, they embarked on a 7 date run of the UK, in support of the UK release of Threads, and are supporting Motion City Soundtrack on most of their UK and US tour dates.
In October 2012, Now, Now was featured in an international TV commercial for Microsoft Windows 8.  The commercial included footage of the band members performing Dead Oaks.

Now, Now made their television debut on Late Night with Jimmy Fallon on November 7, 2012, performing "Thread".

In early 2013 Now, Now joined To Write Love on Her Arms's Heavy and Light US tour.

Delays and Saved (2014–Present)
In 2014, the band announced that they were in the process of writing a new record.

2015 saw no new touring or new releases for Now, Now, but the band continued to interact with fans through social media, maintaining that the new record was still being written. They were announced to appear at both the 2016 and 2017 editions of the SXSW festival, however in both instances they withdrew without commenting on the scheduled appearances.

On May 8, 2017 the band deleted all previous content from their Twitter and Facebook page and posted a short teaser video. No comments were provided with the video. Furthermore, the band's new homepage nownowmusic.com was opened. The following day an eight-date US Summer tour was announced - their first since 2013.

On May 11, 2017 the band released a new single, "SGL." It was also announced that Jess Abbott amicably parted ways with the band.

The band released another single, "Yours," on September 15, 2017. They had posted a number of teaser videos to their social media accounts in advance of the release and premiered the song September 14 on The Fader.

The band released a third single, "AZ," on March 1, 2018, along with announcing the title of their new album Saved, set for a May 18 release date.

On May 2, 2018, the band released a fourth and final single, "MJ."

On April 9, 2019, the band released their first single of 2019 called "Enda"

Band members

Current members
Acacia "KC" Dalager – vocals, guitars, keyboards (2003–present)
Bradley Hale – drums, percussion, backing vocals (2003–present)

Former members
Jess Abbott – guitars, backing vocals (2009–2017)

Former live members
Britty Hale – keyboards (2008-2009)
Justin Schweim – bass (2008)
Christine Sako – bass (2008-2011)

Timeline

Discography

Albums
 Cars (2009) - Afternoon Records
 Threads (2012) - Trans- Records
 Saved (2018) - LAB/Trans- Records

EPs
 Not One, But Two (2008) - Afternoon Records
 In The City (2008) - Afternoon Records
 Neighbors (2010) - No Sleep Records
 Dead Oaks (2012) - Trans- Records

Remix albums
 Neighbors: The Remixes (2011) - No Sleep Records
 Threads Remixed (2014) - Trans- Records

Music videos
 "Thread" (2012)
 "SGL" (2017)
 "Yours" (2017)
 "AZ" (2018)
 "MJ" (2018)
 "Enda" (2019)

References

Indie rock musical groups from Minnesota
Musical groups established in 2003
American musical trios
No Sleep Records artists
LGBT-themed musical groups
Tapete Records artists
2003 establishments in Minnesota